The Brewton Millers were a Minor League Baseball team that represented the city of Brewton, Alabama. They played in the Alabama State League from 1940–1941 and from 1946–1950. A previous team played in Brewton in 1903 in the Interstate League.

External links
Baseball Reference
Remembering Brewton's Boy's of Summer

Baseball teams established in 1940
Defunct minor league baseball teams
Professional baseball teams in Alabama
Defunct Alabama State League teams
Baseball teams disestablished in 1950
Washington Senators minor league affiliates
Chicago White Sox minor league affiliates
1940 establishments in Alabama
1950 disestablishments in Alabama
Defunct baseball teams in Alabama